Epidendrum kautskyi  is a species of orchid of the genus Epidendrum. This is an epiphytic orchid occurring in Brazil.

References 

kautskyi
Orchids of Brazil
Epiphytic orchids